The South Island, with an area of , is the largest landmass of New Zealand; it contains about one-quarter of the New Zealand population and is the world's 12th-largest island. The east side of the island is home to the Canterbury Plains while the West Coast is famous for its rough coastlines such as Fiordland, a very high proportion of native bush, and Fox and Franz Josef Glaciers.
The dramatic landscape of the South Island has made it a popular location for the production of several films, including The Lord of the Rings trilogy and The Chronicles of Narnia: The Lion, the Witch and the Wardrobe. It lies at similar latitudes to Tasmania (an island south of the Australian mainland), and parts of Patagonia in South America.

Geology and earthquakes

On 4 September 2010, the South Island was struck by a 7.1 magnitude earthquake, which caused extensive damage, several power outages, and many reports of aftershocks. Five and a half months later, 22 February Christchurch earthquake of 6.3 magnitude caused far more additional damage in Christchurch, resulting in 181 deaths. This quake struck at about lunchtime and was centred closer at Lyttelton, and shallower than the prior quake, consequently causing extensive damage.

The Alpine Fault runs through most of the South Island, The last major earthquake on the fault was in 1717, and it is likely that another one will occur in the next fifty years. Previous earthquakes have also occurred on the Apline Fault.

Climate

The climate in the South Island is mostly temperate. January and February are the warmest months while July is the coldest.

Conditions vary sharply across the regions from extremely wet on the West Coast to semi-arid in the Mackenzie Basin of inland Canterbury. The southern and south-western parts of South Island have a cooler and cloudier climate, with around 1,400–1,600 hours of sunshine annually; the northern and north-eastern parts of the South Island are the sunniest areas and receive about 2,400–2,500 hours.

Climate data

Climate change

Natural geographic features

Fiords

The South Island has 15 named maritime fiords which are all located in the southwest of the island in a mountainous area known as Fiordland. The spelling 'fiord' is used in New Zealand rather than 'fjord', although all the maritime fiords use the word Sound in their name instead.

A number of lakes in the Fiordland and Otago regions also fill glacial valleys. Lake Te Anau has three western arms which are fiords (and are named so). Lake McKerrow / Whakatipu Waitai to the north of Milford Sound / Piopiotahi is a fiord with a silted-up mouth. Lake Wakatipu fills a large glacial valley, as do lakes Hakapoua, Poteriteri, Monowai and Hauroko in the far south of Fiordland. Lake Manapouri has fiords as its west, north and south arms.

The Marlborough Sounds, a series of deep indentations in the coastline at the northern tip of the South Island, are in fact rias, drowned river valleys.

Glaciers

Most of New Zealand's glaciers are in the South Island. They are generally found in the Southern Alps near the Main Divide.

An inventory of South Island glaciers during the 1980s indicated there were about 3,155 glaciers with an area of at least . About a sixth of these glaciers covered more than 10 hectares. These include the Fox and Franz Josef glaciers on the West Coast, and the Haupapa / Tasman, Hooker, Mueller and Murchison glaciers in the east.

Lakes

There are some 3,820 lakes in New Zealand with a surface area larger than one hectare. Much of the higher country in the South Island was covered by ice during the glacial periods of the last two million years. Advancing glaciers eroded large steep-sided valleys, and often carried piles of moraine (rocks and soil) that acted as natural dams. When the glaciers retreated, they left basins that are now filled by lakes. The level of most glacial lakes in the upper parts of the Waitaki and Clutha / Mata-Au rivers are controlled for electricity generation. Hydroelectric reservoirs are common in South Canterbury and Central Otago, the largest of which is Lake Benmore, on the Waitaki River.

The South Island has 8 of New Zealand's 10 biggest lakes. They were formed by glaciers and include Lake Wakatipu, Lake Tekapo and Lake Manapouri. The deepest (462 m) is Lake Hauroko, in western Southland. It is the 16th deepest lake in the world. Millions of years ago, Central Otago had a huge lake – Lake Manuherikia. It was slowly filled in with mud, and fossils of fish and crocodiles have been found there.

Volcanoes

There are four extinct volcanoes in the South Island, all located on the east coast.

Banks Peninsula forms the most prominent of these volcanic features. Geologically, the peninsula comprises the eroded remnants of two large shield volcanoes (Lyttelton formed first, then Akaroa). These formed due to intraplate volcanism between about eleven and eight million years ago (Miocene) on a continental crust. The peninsula formed as offshore islands, with the volcanoes reaching to about 1,500 m above sea level. Two dominant craters formed Lyttelton / Whakaraupō and Akaroa Harbours.

The Canterbury Plains formed from the erosion of the Southern Alps (an extensive and high mountain range caused by the meeting of the Indo-Australian and Pacific tectonic plates) and from the alluvial fans created by large braided rivers. These plains reach their widest point where they meet the hilly sub-region of Banks Peninsula. A layer of loess, a rather unstable fine silt deposited by the foehn winds which bluster across the plains, covers the northern and western flanks of the peninsula. The portion of crater rim lying between Lyttelton Harbour / Whakaraupō and Christchurch city forms the Port Hills.

The Otago Harbour was formed from the drowned remnants of a giant shield volcano, centred close to what is now the town of Port Chalmers. The remains of this violent origin can be seen in the basalt of the surrounding hills. The last eruptive phase ended some ten million years ago, leaving the prominent peak of Mount Cargill.

Timaru was constructed on rolling hills created from the lava flows of the extinct Mount Horrible, which last erupted many thousands of years ago.

Te Wāhipounamu World Heritage Site

Te Wāhipounamu (Māori for "the place of greenstone") is a World Heritage Site in the south west corner of the South Island.

It is thought to contain some of the best modern representations of the original flora and fauna present in Gondwanaland, one of the reasons for listing as a World Heritage Site.

Protected areas

Forest parks

There are six forest parks in the South Island that are on public land administered by the Department of Conservation.
 Catlins Forest Park  Situated in the Southland region.
 Craigieburn Forest Park  Situated in the Canterbury Region, its boundaries lie in part alongside State Highway 73 and is adjacent to the eastern flanks of the Southern Alps. The Broken River Ski Area and the Craigieburn Valley Ski Area lie within its borders. The New Zealand Forest Service had used the area as an experimental forestry area and there is now an environmental issue with the spread of wilding conifers.
 Hanmer Forest Park  Situated in the Canterbury Region.
 Lake Sumner Forest Park  Situated in the Canterbury Region.
 Mount Richmond Forest Park  Situated in the Marlborough region.
 Victoria Forest Park  Situated in the West Coast region.

National parks

The South Island has ten national parks established under the National Parks Act 1980 and which are administered by the Department of Conservation.

From north to south, the National Parks are:
 Kahurangi National Park  (4,520 km2, established 1996) Situated in the north-west of the South Island, Kahurangi comprises spectacular and remote country and includes the Heaphy Track. It has ancient landforms and unique flora and fauna. It is New Zealand's second largest national park.
 Abel Tasman National Park  (225 km2, established 1942) Has numerous tidal inlets and beaches of golden sand along the shores of Tasman Bay / Te Tai-o-Aorere. It is New Zealand's smallest national park.
 Nelson Lakes National Park  (1,018 km2, established 1956) A rugged, mountainous area in Nelson Region. It extends southwards from the forested shores of Lake Rotoiti and Rotoroa to the Lewis Pass National Reserve.
 Paparoa National Park  (306 km2, established 1987) On the West Coast of the South Island between Westport and Greymouth. It includes the celebrated Pancake Rocks at Punakaiki.
 Arthur's Pass National Park  (1,144 km2, established 1929) A rugged and mountainous area straddling the main divide of the Southern Alps.
 Westland Tai Poutini National Park  (1,175 km2, established 1960) Extends from the highest peaks of the Southern Alps to a wild remote coastline. Included in the park are glaciers, scenic lakes and dense rainforest, plus remains of old gold mining towns along the coast.
 Aoraki / Mount Cook National Park  (707 km2, established 1953) An alpine park, containing New Zealand's highest mountain, Aoraki / Mount Cook (3,754 m) and its longest glacier, Haupapa / Tasman Glacier (29 km). A focus for mountaineering, ski touring and scenic flights, the park is an area of outstanding natural beauty. Together, the Aoraki / Mount Cook and Westland Tai Poutini National Parks have been declared a World Heritage Site.
 Mount Aspiring National Park  (3,555 km2, established 1964) A complex of impressively glaciated mountain scenery centred on Mount Aspiring / Tititea (3,036 m), New Zealand's highest peak outside of the main divide.
 Fiordland National Park  (12,519 km2, established 1952) The largest national park in New Zealand and one of the largest in the world. The grandeur of its scenery, with its deep fiords, its lakes of glacial origin, its mountains and waterfalls, has earned it international recognition as a world heritage area.
 Rakiura National Park  (1,500 km2, established 2002) On Stewart Island / Rakiura.

Other native reserves and parks
 Hakatere Conservation Park

Natural history

During the Last Glacial Period when sea levels were over 100 metres lower than present day levels, the North and South Islands were connected by a vast coastal plain which formed at the South Taranaki Bight. Similarly, the South Island and Stewart Island / Rakiura were connected by coastal plains which covered modern-day Foveaux Strait. During this period, most of the South Island was covered in grassland and glaciers, compared to the woodlands and rainforest which grew in the more temperate North Island. Sea levels began to rise 7,000 years ago, eventually separating the islands and linking the Cook Strait to the Tasman Sea.

Birds

There are several bird species which are endemic to the South Island. They include the kea, great spotted kiwi, Okarito brown kiwi, South Island kōkako, South Island pied oystercatcher, Malherbe's parakeet, king shag, takahē, black-fronted tern, South Island robin, rock wren, wrybill, and yellowhead.

Many South Island bird species are now extinct, mainly due to hunting by humans and predation by cats and rats introduced by humans. Extinct species include the South Island goose, South Island giant moa, Haast's eagle and South Island piopio.

See also
 North Island
 Geography of New Zealand
 Climate of New Zealand
 Geography of North Island

References

South Island
South Island